Angela Meade (born 1977) is an American operatic soprano.

Life and career
Born in Centralia, Washington, Meade started her education at Centralia Community College before going on to earn a Bachelor of Music degree in Voice from Pacific Lutheran University and a Master of Music degree in Voice from the Thornton School of Music at the University of Southern California before pursuing further studies at the Academy of Vocal Arts in Philadelphia. She has won more than 50 vocal competitions, including the Metropolitan Opera National Council Auditions (2007) and the Grand Prize at the Montreal International Musical Competition (2009). In 2011 she was awarded the prestigious Richard Tucker Award and in 2012 she was the recipient of the Metropolitan Opera's Beverly Sills Artist Award.

Meade made her professional operatic debut at the Metropolitan Opera as Elvira in Verdi's Ernani in March 2008 stepping in for an ill colleague, a role she reprised with the company in February 2012, which was broadcast as part of the Met's Live in HD series and in March/April 2015. At the Met she has also performed the roles of the Countess in Mozart's Le Nozze di Figaro (2009) and the title roles in both Donizetti's Anna Bolena (2011) and Bellini's Norma (2013) as well as Leonora in Verdi's Il trovatore (2013 and 2016), and Alice in Verdi's Falstaff (2013/14), conducted by James Levine, which was broadcast as part of the Met's Live in HD series and was released on DVD by Decca. She has sung Donna Anna in Mozart's Don Giovanni with Los Angeles Opera in 2012 under the baton of Plácido Domingo, Cincinnati Opera in 2013 and the Metropolitan Opera in 2017. She has been a part of the Caramoor International Music Festival in the title roles of Rossini's Semiramide (2009), Bellini's Norma (2010), Donizetti's Lucrezia Borgia (2014) as well as Hélène in Verdi's Les vêpres siciliennes (2013) and as Imogene in Bellini's Il pirata (2017) and performances of the title role in Mercadante's Virginia at the Wexford Festival Opera in 2010

For Meade's 2019-2020 season, she made a house and role debut as Aïda with Gran Teatre del Liceu in Barcelona;  a role debut as Elisabetta in Don Carlo in a return to the Palacio de la Opera in Coruña, Spain; a house debut with Teatro di San Carlo in Naples, Italy in the title role of Rossini's notoriously difficult Ermione; a debut with the Ravinia Festival in Mahler's 8th Symphony under the baton of Marin Alsop; and a debut with the Rossini Opera Festival in Pesaro, Italy for both a recital in collaboration with pianist, Giulio Zappa and as part of their gala concert under the baton of Carlo Rizzi. In addition, she will return to ABAO Bilbao for the title role of Donizetti's Anna Bolena; and a return to Portland SummerFest for a concert of Verdi's greatest hits.

Meade's 2018-2019 season included a return to the Metropolitan Opera for her role debut as Margherita in Arrigo Boito's Mefistofele; her debut with Seattle opera as Leonora in Verdi's Il Trovatore; a return to Teatro de la Maestranza in Seville for Verdi's Il Trovatore and a return to Dallas Opera as Alice in Verdi's Falstaff. On the concert stage she returned to Palacio de la Opera in Coruña Spain for a special evening of arias; presented recitals both in Vancouver's Singer Behind the Song Recital Series and for the McCammon Foundation at Fort Worth Opera; as well as performances of Verdi's Requiem both with Yannick Nézet-Séguin and the Orchestre Métropolitan in honor of Jacqueline Desmarais and for her debut with the RTÉ National Symphony Orchestra in Dublin under the baton of Michele Mariotti.

Meade's 2017-2018 season included a return to Washington National Opera for her role debut in Handel's Alcina; back to back contracts at the Metropolitan Opera for the title roles of Bellini's Norma and Rossini's Semiramide (broadcast live in HD); a return to Teatro Regio di Torino for Giselda in Verdi's I Lombardi; a return to Frankfurt Opera in her role debut as Cilea's Adriana Lecouvreur as well as recitals with the Philadelphia Chamber Music Society and Performance Santa Fe, a concert with her husband and tenor, John Matthew Myers with the Allentown Symphony and Mahler's 8th Symphony with Yannick Nézet-Séguin for her debut with the Rotterdam Philharmonic.

Discography 
2007: Documentary with Jamie Barton, Amber Wagner, Michael Fabiano, Alek Shrader, Ryan Smith, Kiera Duffy, Dísella Làrusdóttir, Ryan McKinny, Nicholas Pallesen, Matthew Plenk; Marco Armiliato conducting Metropolitan Opera Orchestra and Chorus; Susan Froemke (director); released 2009 Decca
2013: Verdi, Falstaff (complete video recording) with Stephanie Blythe, Lisette Oropesa, Jennifer Johnson Cano, Ambrogio Maestri, Franco Vassallo, Paolo Fanale, Carlo Bosi, Keith Jameson, Christian Van Horn; James Levine conducting Metropolitan Opera Orchestra and Chorus; released 2015 Decca
2015: Donizetti, Le duc d'Albe (complete audio recording) with Michael Spyres, Laurent Naouri, Gianluca Buratto, David Stout, Trystan Llŷr Griffiths, Robin Tritschler, Dawid Kimberg; Sir Mark Elder conducting Hallé Orchestra and Opera Rara Chorus; released 2016 Opera Rara
2018: Verdi, I Lombardi Alla Prima Crociata (complete audio recording) with Francesco Meli, Alex Esposito, Giuseppe Gipali, Lavinia Bini, Antonio Di Matteo, Joshua Sanders, Giuseppe Capoferri, Alexandra Zabala; Michele Mariotti conducting Orchestra and Chorus of the Teatro Regio Torino; released 2018 Dynamic

Repertory 

*cover

References

External links
 
 

1977 births
Living people
Academy of Vocal Arts alumni
American operatic sopranos
Pacific Lutheran University alumni
Richard Tucker Award winners
USC Thornton School of Music alumni
Winners of the Metropolitan Opera National Council Auditions
People from Centralia, Washington
Singers from Washington (state)
21st-century American women opera singers